The Lodger is a 1932 British thriller film directed by Maurice Elvey, and starring Ivor Novello, Elizabeth Allan, and Jack Hawkins. It is based on the 1913 novel The Lodger by Marie Belloc Lowndes, also filmed by Alfred Hitchcock in 1927 (also starring Novello); by John Brahm in 1944; by Hugo Fregonese, as Man in the Attic, in 1953; and by David Ondaatje in 2009.

The film is also known as The Phantom Fiend in the United States, where it was released in truncated form in 1935.

Plot summary

Cast
 Ivor Novello as Michel Angeloff/"The Bosnian Murderer" 
 Elizabeth Allan as Daisy Bunting
 A. W. Baskcomb as George Bunting
 Barbara Everest as Mrs Bunting
 Jack Hawkins as Joe Martin
 Shayle Gardner as Detective Snell
 Peter Gawthorne as Lord Southcliff
 Kynaston Reeves as Bob Mitchell
 Drusilla Wills as Mrs Coles
 Anthony Holles as Silvano
 George Merritt as Commissioner
 Andreas Malandrinos as Rabinovitch

Reception 
In the 2001 film Gosford Park, Ivor Novello is taunted that the film "should just flop like that". The screenwriter Julian Fellowes states in an audio commentary that Novello's talkie remake failed, while the silent original had been a hit.

References

External links
 
 
 

1932 films
1930s English-language films
1930s thriller films
Films based on works by Marie Adelaide Belloc Lowndes
Films directed by Maurice Elvey
British thriller films
Films set in London
British serial killer films
British black-and-white films
Films shot at Twickenham Film Studios
1930s British films
Sound film remakes of silent films
Remakes of British films